During the 2022 Russian invasion of Ukraine, the Zaporizhzhia Nuclear Power Plant has become the center of an ongoing nuclear safety crisis, described by Ukraine as an act of nuclear terrorism by Russia.

The plant, which is the largest of its kind in Europe, has seen destruction of its infrastructure via shelling, damage to its power lines, amounting to what Ukrainian authorities call the largest situation of its kind in history. A potential disaster may exceed the scale of previous disasters at nuclear power plants.

According to a report by the International Atomic Energy Agency (IAEA), "The situation in Ukraine is unprecedented. It is the first time a military conflict has occurred amid the facilities of a large, established nuclear power" program. Nuclear safety expert Attila Aszódi said that an event similar in type and scale to the Chernobyl disaster is technically and physically not possible in the Zaporizhzhia plant, while calling for urgent steps to ensure the safety of the plant.

On 11 September, the last operating reactor at the plant was placed in cold shutdown, a state requiring less energy for cooling, consequently reducing the danger posed by damage to the plant's connection to the wider energy grid. However, spent fuel at the site could still represent a significant risk if storage or cooling systems are damaged by fighting.

Timeline 

The plant has been occupied by Russian forces since 3 March 2022.
On 5 July 2022, The Wall Street Journal reported that Russian forces arranged a military base in the complex by deploying heavy self-propelled multiple rocket launcher BM-30 Smerch. On 19–20 July, three Ukrainian suicide drones attacked Russian "Grad" launcher and military tents at the site. Ukraine's Ministry of Defense said that three Russian occupiers were killed and twelve injured. The occupation administration was reported as saying that at least eleven employees were injured. An occupation official said the reactors were not damaged and it was unlikely they were the target.

On 3 August 2022, Rafael Grossi, head of the IAEA, expressed grave concerns about the physical integrity of the plant, whether all necessary repairs and maintenance were being done, and the security of nuclear material. A mission to inspect the plant was being planned by the IAEA, waiting on approval by Ukrainian and Russian sides, as well as United Nations authorisation. Energoatom opposed an IAEA visit because "any visit would legitimise Russia's presence there". Occupation official Yevhen Balytskyi invited IAEA to visit to show how the Russians were guarding the facility while Ukrainians were attacking it. On 5 August the 750 kV electrical switchboard at the plant was shelled, causing three transformers to shutdown and one of the three operating reactors to be disconnected from the grid, and triggering its emergency protection system.

On 8 August, damage was reported at the plant. Ukrainian authorities said that Russian shelling had damaged three radiation sensors and left a worker hospitalised; Ukrainian President Volodymyr Zelenskyy accused Russia of waging "nuclear terror". Local Russian-backed authorities said that Ukrainian forces had hit the site with a multiple rocket launcher, damaging administrative buildings and an area near a nuclear storage facility. UN secretary general Guterres said "any attack to a nuclear plant is a suicidal thing", calling for IAEA inspectors to be given access. Energoatom called for a demilitarised zone around the plant with international peacekeepers deployed.

On 9 August the head of Energoatom said that Russia planned to disconnect the station from the Ukrainian grid and connect it to the Russian grid.

On 11 August, Russia called a meeting of the United Nations Security Council to discuss the situation at the plant. The Russian delegation stated that Ukrainian forces had on 5 August used heavy artillery to shell the plant, and on 6 August attacked with cluster munitions; they supported a visit by the IAEA. The Ukrainian delegation stated that Russia had "staged shelling of the nuclear power plant", that Russia used the plant to shell Ukrainian towns, and they also supported a visit by the IAEA traveling through Ukrainian controlled territory. The United Arab Emirates delegation reiterated that Article 56 of the Geneva Conventions Protocol I outlawed attacks on nuclear electrical-generating stations. Grossi said the situation was "very alarming" but there was no immediate threat to nuclear safety, though the situation could change.

Also on 11 August, the plant was shelled several times, including near where radioactive materials were stored. Ukraine said that Russia did the shelling, while Russian officials said that Ukraine did it.
On 14 August, Zelenskyy accused Russia of stationing troops at the plant to fire at the cities of Nikopol and Marhanets across Kakhovka Reservoir.
In the second half of August a video emerged that showed Russian military trucks and armored vehicles parked in buildings that housed generating turbines, later confirmed in the IAEA inspection.

On 19 August, Russia agreed to allow IAEA inspectors access to the Zaporizhzhia plant from Ukrainian-held territory, after a phone call between the President of France, Emmanuel Macron, and Russian president, Vladimir Putin. A temporary ceasefire around the plant still needed to be agreed for the inspection. Russia reported that 12 attacks with over 50 artillery shells explosions had been recorded at the plant and the staff town of Enerhodar, by 18 August.

Also on 19 August, Tobias Ellwood, chair of the UK's Defence Select Committee, said that any deliberate damage to the Zaporizhzhia nuclear plant that could cause radiation leaks would be a "breach" of Article 5 of the North Atlantic Treaty, according to which an attack on a member state of NATO is considered an attack on all of them. The next day, United States congressman Adam Kinzinger said that any radiation leak would kill people in NATO countries, which would be an automatic activation of Article 5.

Shelling hit coal ash dumps at the neighbouring coal-fired power station on 23 August, and ash was on fire by 25 August. The 750-kV transmission line to the Dniprovska substation, which was the only one of the four 750-kV transmission lines that had not yet been damaged and cut by military action, passes over the ash dumps. At 12:12pm on 25 August the line cut off due to the fire below, disconnecting the plant and its two operating reactors from the national grid for the first time since it started operating in 1985. In response, reactor 5's back-up generators and coolant pumps started up, and reactor 6 reduced generation. Incoming power was still available via the 330-kV line to the substation at the coal-fired station, so the diesel generators were not essential for cooling reactor cores and spent fuel pools. The 750-kV line and reactor 6 resumed operation at 12:29pm, but the line was cut by fire again two hours later. The line, but not the reactors, resumed operation again later that day. On 26 August, one reactor restarted in the afternoon and another in the evening, resuming electricity supplies to the grid. The reactors and spent fuel pools depend on water from the Kakhovka Reservoir for cooling. The reservoir is created by the Kakhovka Hydroelectric Power Plant dam, which is a main conflict location of the two war participants.

IAEA inspection 

On 29 August, an IAEA expert mission led by Rafael Grossi left Vienna. On 1 September 2022, the IAEA team passed through the frontline in armoured white land cruisers, where they were held at the first check point outside Zaporizhzhia because of shelling reports. In the previous few days the staff town of Enerhodar had been under intense shelling. Grossi said he was aware of "increased military activity in the area" but would press ahead with the visit. Russia accused Ukraine of trying to seize the plant that morning with 60 troops crossing the Dnieper river at 6 am local time. Energoatom said Russian shelling of the plant had forced the shutdown of one of the two operating reactors. The IAEA team arrived at 1 pm and commenced the inspection. Grossi said that the "plant and physical integrity of the plant" had been "violated several times" and that IAEA inspectors would remain at the site.

On 2 September, Russia said IAEA inspectors will be allowed to remain permanently at the nuclear plant. Ukrainian president Zelenskyy criticised the IAEA for not yet calling for the demilitarisation of the plant. At a press conference that evening just after arriving back in Vienna, Grossi said six inspectors had remained at the plant, and two of those would stay permanently. They had been able to see all parts of the plant they requested to see, and the plant's staff worked in an admirable and professional way with the Russian occupier's nuclear experts. He said that some plant staff had decided to leave, while others continue to work; two reactors continue to operate. Physical damage had occurred at the plant, and the level of military operations in the region is increasing and on site there were references to military offensives and counter-offensives which concerns him a lot. He said inspectors would have a stabilising effect, but they could not stop the war or give the plant back to the Ukrainian authorities. Energoatom responded by stating the IAEA inspectors were manipulated and lied to by the Russian occupiers.

On 2 September, Ukraine's armed forces' general staff said that it carried out precision strikes around the staff town of Enerhodar. That night or the following night Russian "Grad" MLRS launchers were filmed firing from the area of the nuclear power plant.

On 3 September, Russia stated that it foiled a landing attempt by Ukrainian force of over 250 marines at about 11 pm that evening by using helicopters and fighter jets, destroying 20 vessels and scattering others. Details of the landing operation different in time and across the media (TASS reported 15-40 speedboats, Russian MoD reported 7 speedboats), and no photographic or video evidence was presented for the landing, apart from a single video which was later revealed as staged.

In the early hours of 3 September shelling cut the Dniprovska power line, the last working 750 kV power line from the plant, however electricity production continued using a 330 kV reserve power line via the nearby thermal power plant. A reactor was disconnected from the grid in the afternoon, leaving one in operation. Energoatom said that reactor five had been disconnected from the grid due to "non-stop shelling by occupying Russian forces".

On 5 September, the IAEA reported that more shells hit the plant. The 330 kV reserve power line to the nearby thermal power plant was temporarily disconnected for a fire to be extinguished, with the sole operating reactor provided electricity for safety systems. As planned, four inspectors left leaving the two permanent IAEA inspectors at the plant.

On 7 September Centre for Information Resilience published a report analyzing the available open source footage of the shelling incidents over the last few months and concluded that the evidence such as direction of impact craters indicates the shelling originated from Russia-controlled areas, which is consistent with observed presence of Russian weapons such as MLRS on these areas.

IAEA report 
On 6 September, the IAEA issued a report on the nuclear facilities in Ukraine. The report's main conclusion was that the occupation of the plant by Russian armed forces violates all seven pillars of nuclear safety

 In March during the Russian siege of the plant damaged training center, laboratory and administrative building were damaged by projectiles. During following months Russian cruise missiles were observed flying over the plant (but targeted elsewhere). In July Russian troops placed significant amounts of military equipment in the turbine halls of the plant as well as a number of armored vehicles outside. In August shelling damaged nitrogen-oxygen station, external power supplies, switchboards, transformers, spent fuel facility and cabling used by radiation monitoring system. Up to 40 units of military vehicles were located at the plant. A number of other damages were observed by the IAEA plant during 3 September.
 Russian troops took control over the plant's security and access control systems. IAEA noted that plant's security systems should be operated "as designed and licensed" under Ukrainian legislation, and that presence of military vehicles inside plant violates operations of safety and security equipment of the plant.
 IAEA noted presence of 11 staff from Rosatom who was demanding daily reports and "confidential information"  from the plant's personnel, including details on the plants access control systems, operations, fuel and waste management and administrative procedures, creating "interference with the normal lines of operational command or authority". The situation had negative impact on the plant's staff, who has been working under significant and prolonged stress and pressure which can lead to increased likelihood of human error. The IAEA condemned violent acts carried out "at or near the ZNPP or against its staff". The mission also highlighted that the operating staff has limited access to numerous areas of the plant which are controlled by Russian military which hinders ability to repair damages.
 Up to 40% positions related to physical protection were not staffed, with 907 people currently available for three shifts while normal staffing level was 1230. Insufficient number of fire brigade employees (80 vs normal 150) created a need to increase working shifts from 24 to 48 hours.
 Two out of four main high-voltage lines were damaged during early occupation of the plant. Later, a third line was damaged. IAEA assessed that having in total five external supply lines the plant is safe to operate, but the safety margin has been limited. The plant also has 20 emergency diesel generators, some of which have been used during various shelling incidents damaging parts of the supply system.
 Supply chains to and from the plant, including fuel, waste and spare parts, were interrupted by the occupation and delivery of spare parts for diesel generators became "extremely difficult" and possible mostly thanks to personal arrangements of the staff. Otherwise, material reserves of the plant were sufficient at 98.5%.
 Apart from 24-hours' interruption caused by shelling, the radiation monitoring systems were operating as expected. Plants emergency center has been occupied by the military administration. Communications of the plant management with the Ukraine's nuclear regulator were frequently disrupted and later limited to mobile phone and email channels, subject to interference by the occupying military. No regulatory inspections have been possible since occupation started.

On 15 September, the IAEA Board of Governors passed a resolution calling on Russia to leave the power plant. The resolution was supported by 26 countries and opposed by 2 (Russia and China).

Shut down 
After the publication of the IAEA report, as shelling of the plant continued, the plant was operating disconnected from the grid in "island mode" for a few days. In that mode the last operational reactor was used to power plant's own safety systems. On 11 September, at 3.14am, the sixth and final reactor was disconnected from the grid, "completely stopping" the plant. The statement from Energoatom said that "Preparations are underway for its cooling and transfer to a cold state". Both sides continued to blame each other for the military action in and around the plant.

On 21 September, shelling within the plant damaged cables near unit 6 turbine hall, temporarily causing two of unit 6's three emergency diesel generators to run for about 40 minutes to provide power while repairs were made. The other five reactors were not affected. The previous day shelling took one of the reactor cooling ponds out of service.

On 30 September, Ihor Murashov, director general of the plant, was detained by Russian soldiers. Energoatom said that Murashov's arrest threatened the safety of the plant, and accused Russia of attempting to transfer control of the plant to the Russian company Rosatom. He was released within a few days and was evacuated to territory controlled by Ukraine.

Potential restart 

On 5 October, the Associated Press reported that in an interview, Energoatom President Petro Kotin said that the energy company could restart two of the reactors within days, with a decision to be made as early as 12 October, to protect safety installations. Kotin said that due to low temperatures over the coming winter, safety equipment will be damaged without heating, and that the only heating will come from the reactors.

On the same day, Russian President Vladimir Putin decreed the takeover of the plant, and designated it as federal property. The head of Energoatom also announced the takeover. The decree said that after the accession of Zaporizhzhia Oblast to the Russian Federation a new company would be formed, headed by the former chief engineer of Balakovo Nuclear Power Plant which has similar nuclear reactors. Existing operating licences would continue until new ones were issued in accordance with Russian laws.

Ukraine called this an illegal attempt to take over the plant and called for sanctions against Rosatom and other Russian nuclear companies. Energoatom transferred administrative control of the plant to its headquarters in Kyiv.

On 6 October, IAEA Director General Grossi had a meeting with Ukrainian President Zelensky in Kyiv to discuss developments regarding the ownership of the plant and IAEA's proposal of a nuclear safety and security protection zone around the plant. Grossi then met Russian President Putin in Moscow on 11 October, after which Grossi decided to meet with Zelensky again.

On 8 October, the plant lost its connection to external power supplies due to shelling, and backup diesel generators started. Each backup diesel generator has fuel to operate for 10 days, but not all need to be operated. The following day, a 750 kV power line was repaired and connected to the grid. The IAEA reported that almost every day there was shelling in the region of the plant, and that a landmine had exploded outside the plant, part of a series of landmine blasts in recent weeks. On 12 October, the plant again lost its connection to external power supplies due to shelling, the second time in a week.

November shelling 

On 19 and 20 November the nuclear power plant was subjected to the most intense bombing in months, as the head of the IAEA reported. IAEA experts reported more than a dozen blasts, with "damage in several places", but none so far critical for nuclear safety as the external power supplies were not affected and radiation levels remained normal. The IAEA said the forces behind the shelling were "playing with fire" and called for "urgent measures to help prevent a nuclear accident" in the Russian-occupied plant.

Russia and Ukraine blamed each other for shelling the Russian-controlled plant. Russia claimed that the large-calibre shells came from the Ukrainian-controlled city of Marhanets. The Ukrainian nuclear energy agency said that Russia was responsible for the shelling, which they claimed had damaged exactly the infrastructure needed to restore energy production for Ukrainian needs.

See also 
2022 Russian strikes against Ukrainian infrastructure
Nuclear threats during the 2022 Russian invasion of Ukraine

References 

Events affected by the 2022 Russian invasion of Ukraine
Attacks on electrical infrastructure in Ukraine
Nuclear power plants and the 2022 Russian invasion of Ukraine
Russian war crimes in Ukraine
Nuclear terrorism
Nuclear safety and security
Southern Ukraine campaign